The 1948 Nebraska gubernatorial election was held on November 2, 1948, and featured incumbent Governor Val Peterson, a Republican, defeating Democratic nominee, former state Senator Frank Sorrell, to win a second two-year term in office.

Democratic primary

Candidates
Frank Sorrell, former member of the Nebraska Legislature

Results

Republican primary

Candidates
Roland Max Anderson
Lloyd M. Ewing
Val Peterson, incumbent Governor
Andrew E. Swanson
A. B. Walker

Results

General election

Results

References

Gubernatorial
1948
Nebraska
November 1948 events in the United States